Kakabai is an Austronesian language spoken in Milne Bay Province of Papua New Guinea.

Alphabet 
Kakabai language has 20 letters (Aa, Bb, Dd, Ee, Gg, Ḡḡ, Ii, Kk, Ll, Mm, Nn, Oo, Pp, Rr, Ss, Tt, Uu, Vv, Ww, Yy) and 1 diphthong (kw).

References

External links 
 Alphabet and pronunciation

Nuclear Papuan Tip languages
Languages of Milne Bay Province